Zhaoping County is a county in the east of Guangxi, China. It is under the administration of the prefecture-level city of Hezhou.  Within Zhaopin County are the towns and villages of Zhaoping (昭平镇), Wenzhu (文竹镇), Huangyao (黄姚镇), Fuluo (富罗镇), Beituo (北陀镇), Majiang (马江镇), Wujiang (五将镇), Xianhui Yao Township (仙回瑶族乡), Zhouma Township (走马乡), Zhangmulin Township (樟木林乡), Fenghuang Township (凤凰乡), and Muge Township (木格乡).

Climate

References

Counties of Guangxi
Administrative divisions of Hezhou